Good Luck and Do Your Best is the third studio album by English electronic music producer Gold Panda. It was released through City Slang on 27 May 2016.

Track listing

Charts

References

External links
 

2016 albums
City Slang albums
Gold Panda albums